Edward Harold Physick (20 July 1878 – 30 August 1972) was an English writer, known chiefly as a critic and authority on John Milton; also a poet and fantasy writer. He used the pseudonym E. H. Visiak from 1910.

Life

He was born in Ealing, London.  Both his father, Edward James Physick (the younger), and his grandfather, Edward James Physick (the elder), were sculptors. His maternal uncle was W. H. Helm, writer and critic.

He went to Hitchin Grammar School (now Hitchin Boys School), and became a clerk with the Indo-European Telegraph Company. He contributed poetry to The New Age and Dora Marsden's Freewoman.

During World War I the poetry he wrote, in opposition to it, cost him his job. When conscription was introduced, he became a conscientious objector. After a short time teaching he became an independent scholar, living very quietly. During the 1930s he collaborated on some short stories, with John Gawsworth in particular.

A friend and enthusiast of the Scottish novelist David Lindsay, Visiak wrote three short macabre novels, The Haunted Island, Medusa and The Shadow, and the autobiography Life's Morning Hour. He provided an introductory note for Lindsay's novel A Voyage to Arcturus.

The Haunted Island (1st edition Elkin Mathews, 1910; reprint Peter Lund, 1946) features the adventures of Francis and Dick Clayton in the seventeenth century, who sail a seized ship to one of the Juan Fernández Islands. They there fall into the hands of pirates, meet a ghost, and a wizard who rules over a colony of slaves.  Ultimately they find a treasure.

The Shadow was not published separately but was incorporated in John Gawsworth's anthology Crimes, Creeps and Thrills (1936) (which also included Visiak's story "Medusan Madness").

Much of Visiak's supernatural work bears similarities to that of William Hope Hodgson since both writers were fascinated by the lure and power of the sea, which forms the focus of the majority of their literary work.

Critical reception

His novel Medusa: A Story of Mystery (1929) became popular in the 1960s. Mike Ashley describes Medusa as Visiak's "premier achievement". Medusa was also included by horror historian Robert S. Hadji in his list of "unjustly neglected" horror novels. An essay on the novel by Karl Edward Wagner appears in the anthology Horror: 100 Best Books (1988; revised edition 1992). China Miéville has also expressed admiration for Visiak's work.

Works

Poetry
Buccaneer Ballads (1910)
Flints and Flashes (1911)
The Phantom Ship (1912)
The Battle Fiends (1916)
Brief Poems (1919)

Novels
The Haunted Island (1910)
Medusa: A Story of Mystery (1929)
The Shadow (1936)

Literary criticism
Milton's Agonistes: a metaphysical criticism (1923)
Mirror of Conrad (1955)
The Portent of Milton: Some Aspects of His Genius (1958)
The Strange Genius of David Lindsay (1970; with J. B. Pick and Colin Wilson)

As editor
The Mask of Comus (1937)
Milton's Lament for Damon and his other Latin poems (1935; with Walter W. Skeat)
Richards' Shilling Selections from Edwardian Poets (1936)
Milton: Complete Poetry and Selected Prose, with English Metrical Translations of the Latin, Greek and Italian Poems (1938)

Autobiography
Life's Morning Hour (1969)

Critical study/anthology
Harrison-Barbet, Anthony (Introduction by Colin Wilson). E. H. Visiak:  Writer and Mystic (2007), Nottingham, England: Paupers' Press

References

External links

 

1878 births
1972 deaths
People from Ealing
English male poets
English horror writers
English fantasy writers
English literary critics
British conscientious objectors
People educated at Hitchin Boys' School
English male short story writers
English short story writers
English male novelists
English male non-fiction writers
Weird fiction writers